The 1999 Grand Prix of Mosport was an American Le Mans Series professional sports car race held at Mosport International Raceway near Bowmanville, Ontario, Canada from June 25 to the 27, 1999.  The race was the third round of the inaugural American Le Mans Series season, replacing the former Professional SportsCar Racing Championship that previously held the Grand Prix beginning in 1975.  The race marked the 14th IMSA / Professional SportsCar Racing sanctioned sports car race held at the facility.

Race

The race marked the maiden win for the Panoz LMP-1 Roadster-S driven by Johnny O'Connell and Jan Magnussen for Panoz Motor Sports.  It was the first front-engine sportscar overall win at a major event since the 1960s. Teammates David Brabham and Éric Bernard in the #1 Panoz finished second, while Team Rafanelli drivers Érik Comas and Mimmo Schiattarella took third overall in the Riley & Scott Mk III.

After their recent victory at the 1999 24 Hours of Le Mans, the event was also set to feature the BMW V12 LMR of BMW Motorsport.  After qualifying third and fourth behind the Panoz entries, the team withdrew from the race citing safety concerns at the track.  Following offseason upgrades to Mosport, the team returned to the track for the 2000 edition of the race.

After back to back 24 Hours of Le Mans class victories in 1998 and 1999 and FIA GT Championships in 1997 and 1998, Dodge Viper Team Oreca debuted their Dodge Viper GTS-R in the American Le Mans Series at Mosport, taking the GTS class victory with drivers Olivier Beretta and David Donohue.

Alex Job Racing took the GT class win with drivers Cort Wagner and Dirk Müller in a Porsche 911 Carrera RSR.

The race was broadcast across North America on CNBC with Joel Meyers and Bill Adam calling the race.

Official results
Class winners in bold.

Notes 
 The No. 42 and No. 43 BMW V12 LMR were withdrawn from the event following qualifying, because BMW deemed the track to be too dangerous to race on.

Statistics
 Pole Position - #2 Panoz Motor Sports - 1:10.514
 Fastest Lap - #1 Panoz Motor Sports - 1:12.093
 Time of race - 2:45:11.871
 Distance - 
 Average Speed -

Photo Gallery

References

External links
1999 Grand Prix of Mosport Race Broadcast (YouTube)

Mosport
Grand Prix of Mosport
Grand Prix of Mosport
19990627